Hodgenville Christian Church is a historic church at 100 W. Main Street in Hodgenville, Kentucky.  It was added to the National Register of Historic Places in 1977.

Built in 1877, it is the oldest church in LaRue County and, as one of few survivors of a c. 1910 fire, it is the second oldest building in Hodgenville.  It is built of brick and has a gable roof with a belfry.

References

Churches on the National Register of Historic Places in Kentucky
Churches completed in 1877
19th-century churches in the United States
National Register of Historic Places in LaRue County, Kentucky
1877 establishments in Kentucky
Hodgenville, Kentucky